The 1996–97 Chattanooga Mocs basketball team represented the University of Tennessee at Chattanooga as a member of the Southern Conference during the 1996–97 NCAA Division I men's basketball season. Their head coach was Mack McCarthy and the team played their home games at UTC Arena. The Mocs won the regular season and SoCon tournament titles, the latter earning the Mocs an automatic bid to the 1997 NCAA tournament. Participating in the Big Dance for the fourth time in five years, Chattanooga made a run to the Sweet Sixteen by defeating No. 3 seed Georgia and No. 6 seed Illinois before falling to No. 10 seed Providence in the Southeast Regional semifinals.

Roster

Source:

Schedule and results

|-
!colspan=9 style=| Regular season

|-
!colspan=9 style=| SoCon tournament

|-
!colspan=9 style=| NCAA tournament

Source:

References

Chattanooga Mocs
Chattanooga Mocs men's basketball seasons
Chattanooga Mocs
Chattanooga Mocs
Chattanooga Mocs